Thauria aliris, the tufted jungleking, is a butterfly found in South East Asia that belongs to the Morphinae subfamily of the brush-footed butterflies family.

Distribution

The tufted jungleking ranges among Myanmar, Malaysia, Borneo and Tonkin.

Status
In 1932, William Harry Evans reported the butterfly as very rare in northern Myanmar.

See also
List of butterflies of India
List of butterflies of India (Morphinae)
List of butterflies of India (Nymphalidae)

Cited references

References
 
 

Amathusiini
Butterflies of Borneo